Wil Malone (born 1952, in Hornsey, North London) is a British music producer and arranger, who has worked with artists including Black Sabbath, Iron Maiden, Todd Rundgren, The Verve, Massive Attack, Depeche Mode and Italian rocker Gianna Nannini. In 1976, Malone and Lou Reizner covered a Beatles song, "You Never Give Me Your Money", for the musical documentary All This and World War II.  Malone also did the string arrangements for several songs by collaborative techno group UNKLE.

Malone released an eponymous solo album in 1970 and another called Motherlight and composed the score for the cult horror film Death Line in 1972.

References

External links 
 

1952 births
British record producers
Living people